Tarjei Skarlund (born 6 November 1978) is a male beach volleyball player from Norway. With team mate Jørre Kjemperud, he represented Norway in beach volleyball at the 2008 Summer Olympics in Beijing, China.

At the 2012 Summer Olympics he competed with Martin Spinnangr.

References

External links
 
 
 Tarjei Skarlund at YouTube
 
 
 

1978 births
Living people
Norwegian beach volleyball players
Men's beach volleyball players
Beach volleyball players at the 2008 Summer Olympics
Beach volleyball players at the 2012 Summer Olympics
Olympic beach volleyball players of Norway
Sportspeople from Ålesund